Sun Feifei or Feifei Sun may refer to:
Sun Feifei (actress) (born 1981), Chinese actress
Fei Fei Sun (born 1989), Chinese model